Trabecula truncatelliformis is a species of sea snail, a marine gastropod mollusk in the family Pyramidellidae, the pyrams and their allies.

Distribution
This marine species occurs off Japan.

References

 Hori & Fukuda (1999). The Venus  58 (4) : 175-190|2012-01-12

External links
 To Encyclopedia of Life
 To World Register of Marine Species

Pyramidellidae
Gastropods described in 1999